Darius Paul (born April 8, 1994) is an American professional basketball player for the Albany Patroons of North American Premier Basketball

Collegiately, he played for Robert Morris University in the NAIA, for Western Michigan University in the National Collegiate Athletic Association and was a member of the University of Illinois basketball team, but never appeared in a game.

High school career
Paul played for Warren Township High School. As a high school senior, Paul was named a member of the 2012 Illinois  All-State Team as selected by the Associated Press, Chicago Tribune, Chicago Sun-Times, News-Gazette, and the Illinois Basketball Coaches Association. Through his college recruitment, Paul received interest from Northwestern and Iowa and received scholarship offers from Bradley University, Detroit, IUPUI, Florida Gulf Coast, and Western Michigan. On November 25, 2011, Paul committed to play for Steve Hawkins at Western Michigan.

College career

Freshman
Entering Western Michigan during the 2012–13 season, Paul quickly became a key contributor, as he started 33 of 35 games, averaging 10.5 points and 5.7 rebounds per game. Paul also led all Mid-American Conference freshman in scoring and rebounding, recording five double-doubles throughout the season. He was named  Mid-American Conference Freshman of the Year at the conclusion of the season.

Redshirt sophomore
After announcing his decision to transfer from Western Michigan, Paul announced via Twitter on May 4, 2013 that he would play for John Groce at Illinois, following in the footsteps of his older brother Brandon Paul. Paul also had scholarship offers to Florida, Iowa State, Marquette, Miami (Fl.), Missouri, Nebraska, and Nevada.

Due to NCAA transfer rules, Paul was forced to sit out during the 2013–2014 season. During the season Paul only participated in practices and attended home games at the State Farm Center as an observer. In April 2014, Paul was suspended from the team after being arrested for underage drinking and after resisting arrest. .He pleased guilty to the drinking charge, the resisting arrest charge was dropped. He then went on to spend the 2014–15 season at junior college Lamar State.

Junior College
Paul recorded the fifth triple-double in Lamar State College–Port Arthur Seahawks history in a win over Victoria College, posting a line of 21 points, 13 rebounds and 11 assists. During his junior college season, Paul was also named a top five junior college recruit by the Sporting News. On November 12, 2014, Paul signed his National Letter of Intent to return to Illinois during the 2015–16 season as a redshirt junior. For the 2014–15 season, Paul led the Seahawks in points per game and rebounds per game, averaging a double-double for the majority of the season.

Back at Illinois 
He returned to the University of Illinois for the 2015–16 season. During an exhibition tour in Deauville, France in August 2015, Paul was charged with vandalism, public intoxication and resisting arrest, he was sent home and later dismissed from the team.

Senior 
Paul spent his senior year (2016–17) at Robert Morris University. Averaging 18.7 points, having made 43-of-91 from beyond the arc on the season, 7.9 rebounds, 1.6 assists and 1.1 blocked shots per game, he earned NAIA Division II All-American Honorable Mention Team honors.

College statistics

|-
| style="text-align:left;"| 2012–13
| style="text-align:left;"| Western Michigan
| 35 || 33 || 24.8 || .466 || .227 || .658 || 5.7 || 1.7 || 0.5 || 0.4 || 10.5
|-
| style="text-align:left;"| 2013–14
| style="text-align:left;"| Illinois
| style="text-align:center;" colspan="11"|Did not play due to NCAA transfer regulations
|-
| style="text-align:left;"| 2014–15
| style="text-align:left;"| Lamar State–Port Arthur
| 22 || 20 || - || .438 || .280 || .683 || 9.1 || 3.8 || 1.5 || 2.4 || 17.1
|-
| style="text-align:left;"| 2015–16
| style="text-align:left;"| Illinois
| style="text-align:center;" colspan="11"|Did not play - Dismissed from team
|-
| style="text-align:left;"| 2016–17
| style="text-align:left;"| Robert Morris – Chicago
| 29 || 23 || 26.5 || .587 || .473 || .658 || 7.9 || 1.6 || 1.0 || 1.1 || 18.7
|-

Updated July 3, 2017

Professional basketball 
Coming out of college, Paul signed with Petrolero Argentino of the Argentinian Liga Nacional de Básquet for the 2017–18 season, but was waived in November 2017.

Led the Albany Patroons to a TBL Championship for the in 2019 The Basketball League inaugural season. Also received the  TBL "Most Valuable Player" honor

Personal
Paul is the son of Cliff Sr. and Lynda Paul and he has two brothers, Cliff Jr. and former Fighting Illini basketball player Brandon Paul. Brandon last played for the San Antonio Spurs of the NBA.

References

External links
Western Michigan Profile
Illinois Profile

1994 births
Living people
Basketball players from Illinois
Junior college men's basketball players in the United States
People from Gurnee, Illinois
Power forwards (basketball)
Western Michigan Broncos men's basketball players
American men's basketball players